De Cartier is a Charleroi Metro station, located in the center of Marchienne-au-Pont (part of the Charleroi municipality), in fare zone 2. It is an underground station featuring a central platform with escalator and stairs access at both ends.

The interior of the station, designed by architect Noterman, features a large mural depicting Marchienne-au-Pont somewhere between the 16th and 18th century. Reproductions of old, tilted walls are used as decoration on the opposite side of the station.

Nearby points of interest 
 De Cartier castle, which has given its name to the station.
 Municipal park of Marchienne-au-Pont.
 Marchienne-au-Pont public swimming pool.
 Marchienne-au-Pont city hall.
 Schools: Notre-Dame and Athénée Royal .
 Our Lady of Mercy church.
 Marchienne-au-Pont soccer stadium.

Transfers 
TEC Charleroi bus lines 43, 71, 72, 73, 74, 75, 83, 109a, 172.

Charleroi Metro stations
Railway stations opened in 1992